The La Colorada mine is a large silver mine located in the west of Mexico in Zacatecas. La Colorada represents one of the largest silver reserve in Mexico and in the world having estimated reserves of 64.1 million oz of silver.

See also 
 List of mines in Mexico

References 

Silver mines in Mexico